Alain Goma (born 5 October 1972) is a French former footballer who played as a right back or a central defender.

In a 16-year professional career he appeared in 196 Ligue 1 games, mostly for Auxerre. He then played 147 matches in the Premier League, with Newcastle and Fulham.

Club career
Born in Sault, Vaucluse, Goma started his football career playing for Paris-suburb club RC Versailles, joining AJ Auxerre's famed youth academy in 1988 at the age of 15. Three years later, he made his Ligue 1 debut for the team led by legendary Guy Roux.

In 1992–93, Goma took part in Auxerre's unprecedented semifinal run in the UEFA Cup, where they lost in the semi-finals to AFC Ajax in a penalty shootout. At the end of the season he signed his very first professional contract, going on to be instrumental in the side's 1996 double while also helping them to the 1996–97 UEFA Champions League quarter-finals – losing to eventual winners Borussia Dortmund – after winning the group stage over Ajax.

After ten years at Auxerre, Goma moved to Paris Saint-Germain F.C., conquering the 1998 Trophée des Champions soon after signing. After that single campaign he joined Newcastle United for £4.7 million, becoming an important player at the start of 2000–01 and scoring in a 3–1 win against Middlesbrough in October 2000.

On 13 March 2001, following a dispute with the Magpies, Goma signed with First Division leaders Fulham, who paid a club record £4 million for his services.  On 21 April 2001 he made his debut in a 1–1 draw at Portsmouth, and became a vital player for the club in its debut season in the Premier League, eventually serving as captain under countryman Jean Tigana.

Goma's form earned him a new contract during 2003–04, to keep him at the Cottagers until the summer of 2006. Despite missing two months due to injury, he made his 100th appearance during the campaign but, after the emergence of younger players such as Zat Knight, his importance and role gradually diminished in 2005–06; he was the most notable of six players released on 18 May 2006, after being unable to agree on a new deal.

Goma subsequently retired, aged 33. However, in 2007, he came out of retirement, joining Qatar's Al-Wakrah Sport Club and retiring for good the following year.

International career
After starting representing the French under-21s in 1992, Goma would go on to earn two caps for the senior side. The first was on 9 October 1996, starting in a 4–0 friendly win against Turkey, and the second was in another exhibition game, coming on as a substitute for Frank Lebœuf for the last ten minutes of a 2–2 draw in Austria on 19 August 1998.

Club statistics

Honours
Auxerre
Division 1: 1995–96
Coupe de France: 1993–94, 1995–96

Paris Saint-Germain
Trophée des Champions: 1998

Fulham
Football League First Division: 2000–01
UEFA Intertoto Cup: 2002

References

External links

 

1972 births
Living people
French sportspeople of Democratic Republic of the Congo descent
French footballers
Association football defenders
Ligue 1 players
AJ Auxerre players
Paris Saint-Germain F.C. players
English Football League players
Premier League players
Newcastle United F.C. players
Fulham F.C. players
Qatar Stars League players
Al-Wakrah SC players
France under-21 international footballers
France international footballers
French expatriate footballers
Expatriate footballers in England
Expatriate footballers in Qatar
French expatriate sportspeople in England
French expatriate sportspeople in Qatar
Black French sportspeople